Group D of the men's football tournament at the 2012 Summer Olympics took place from 26 July to 1 August 2012 in Coventry's City of Coventry Stadium, Glasgow's Hampden Park, Manchester's Old Trafford and Newcastle's St James' Park. The group contained Honduras, Japan, Morocco and Spain.

Teams

Standings

Matches

Honduras vs Morocco

Spain vs Japan

Japan vs Morocco

Spain vs Honduras

Notes:
Spain substitute Diego Mariño was given a yellow card on the bench in the 46th minute.

Japan vs Honduras

Spain vs Morocco

References

Group D
Group
2012 in Japanese football
Group
2012–13 in Moroccan football